Glenpool is a city in Tulsa County, Oklahoma, United States. It is part of the Tulsa Metropolitan Statistical Area (TMSA). As of 2020, the population was 14,040, which represented an increase of 29.9% since the 2010 census, which reported the total population as 10,808.

Glenpool is notable because the discovery of oil in 1905, which caused an economic boom that propelled the growth of Tulsa and its surroundings. Although the Glenn Pool Oil Reserve, for which the city was named, still produces a small amount of oil; the city is now primarily a commuter town for Tulsa.

History

On November 22, 1905, wildcatters, Robert Galbreath Jr. and Frank Chesley (along with, by some accounts, Charles Colcord), drilling for oil on farmland owned by Creek Indian Ida E. Glenn, created the first oil gusher in what would soon be known as the "Glenn Pool". The discovery set off a boom of growth for the area, bringing in hordes of people: lease buyers, producers, millionaires, laborers, tool suppliers, drunks, swindlers, and newspeople. Daily production soon exceeded . The nearby city of Tulsa benefited from the production, and Glenpool calls itself the town that made Tulsa famous.

By the end of 1906 a settlement consisting of twelve families had grown up nearby. In that year, the Midland Valley Railroad extended a track from Jenks. By 1907, nearly 3,000 people had moved to the area, but only about 500 people actually lived in the town in 1910. Lots were platted and a post office opened on January 31, 1908. The new community was renamed "Glenpool."

Sometime after the discovery, Ida Glenn and her husband, Robert, sold their farm and moved to California.

In the early days, Glenpool was on the route of the Sapulpa & Interurban Railway (“S&I”) streetcar/interurban line connecting to Tulsa through Kiefer and Sapulpa, as well as south to Mounds; S&I subsequently went through a series of mergers and name changes, with only the Tulsa-to-Sapulpa portion continuing as the Tulsa-Sapulpa Union Railway.

Population grew to 428 in 1920, but declined thereafter to 280 in 1950. A post-WWII building boom then pushed the population upward to 353 in 1960. During the 1970s and 1980s, urban sprawl of the city of Tulsa reached Glenpool, and the town became a bedroom suburb. It has been growing since. By 1970 the population had risen to 770, then to 2,706 in 1980.

An annual celebration called "Black Gold Days" is a three-day, family-friendly event with food, music, arts and crafts, a carnival, and a parade.   It commemorates the early years of Glenpool's history.

Geography
The city is on the eastern edge of the Cross Timbers ecoregion, between the Great Plains and the foot of the Ozarks.

Glenn Pool Oil Field

Galbreath and Chesley had used their own money to pay for an oil drilling rig, with operator, and a lease on Ida Glenn's land. By November 22, 1905, they had drilled through the Red Fork Sand, the deepest known producing sand in the area without striking oil. There was a small stream of natural gas at a depth of 
, so they decided to drill deeper. A few feet further down, the rig encountered a formation known as the Bartlesville Sand, where Chesley noticed the first trace of oil on the drill bit. The well began making a gurgling sound and soon emitted a gusher clear over the derrick. The well soon produced over 75 barrels a day of light, sweet crude oil. Galbreath and Chesley named the well Ida Glenn Number 1. This well was also a producer.

Other people rushed to the area to begin drilling, and soon defined the extent of the field. Prices for leases and for drilling services rose sharply. Fewer than two percent of the wildcat wells failed to produce oil. Some of the Creek landowners began earning as much as a million dollars a year from royalties on the production from their 160-acre plots. According to one source,"... More money was made on the Oklahoma oil boom than the California gold rush and Colorado silver rush combined."

After only one year, the Glenn Pool field had 127 completed wells. Of these, 107 produced oil, 12 found only gas and 11 were dry holes. In addition, 24 more wells were in progress and 33 sites were being readied for drilling. By 1907, the field was increasingly controlled by three companies: Texaco, Gulf Oil Company and Prairie Oil and Gas. Galbreath and Chesley were ready to move on. They sold their Glenn Pool holdings to Edgar Crosbie for $US 500,000 and $US 200,000, respectively.

The Ida Glenn well was plugged and abandoned in 1964. The Glen Pool field still produces a relatively small flow of oil in the 21st century, using waterflood techniques. Over its life span, the field has produced more than 340 million barrels of oil.

Climate

Demographics

As of the census of 2010, there were 10,808 people, 3,723 households, and 2,927 families residing in the city. The population density was 1,045.8 people per square mile (337.2/km). There were 2,849 housing units at an average density of 306.4 per square mile (118.3/km). The racial makeup of the city was 72.6% White, 2.4% African American, 13.2% Native American, 0.9% Asian (0.4% Filipino), 0.1% Pacific Islander, 2.2% from other races, and 8.6% from two or more races. Hispanic or Latino were 5.9% (4.5% Mexican).

There were 3,723 households, out of which 49.7% had children under the age of 18 living with them, 63.2% were married couples living together, 14.3% had a female householder with no husband present, and 18.5% were non-families. 15.7% of all households were made up of individuals, and 3.8% had someone living alone who was 65 years of age or older. The average household size was 2.91 and the average family size was 3.25.

In the city, the population was spread out, with 33.5% under the age of 18, 8.6% from 18 to 24, 35.5% from 25 to 44, 16.8% from 45 to 64, and 5.7% who were 65 years of age or older. The median age was 30 years. For every 100 females, there were 90.3 males. For every 100 females age 18 and over, there were 88.5 males.

The median income for a household in the city was $61,814 and the median income for a family was $66,578. The per capita income for the city was $24,096. Approximately 5.0% of the total population were below the poverty line.

Media
Glenpool had one newspaper, the Glenpool Post. The paper was published every Wednesday. It was owned by Community Publishers, a newspaper and Internet publisher and commercial printer that served Oklahoma, Missouri, and Arkansas. In 2012, the Glenpool Post was merged with the Jenks Journal and the Bixby Bulletin to form the South County Leader with the news focusing on Glenpool being a component in the newspaper. Ultimately, the South County Leader ceased publication in 2014.
The Glenpool Post was started in 1984 by Charles and Susan Biggs and sold to Neighbor Newspapers in 1987.

High school sports
Glenpool High School (GHS) is classified as a 5A school by the OSSAA. Under their former long-time head coach Steve Edwards, Glenpool High School won the Class 4A state football championship in both 2002 and 2008. In 2002, Glenpool High School went 14–0.
Glenpool won the 2016 state championship in Track and Field along with having a state champion in cross country.
Glenpool Boys’ Basketball won the 2020 regional championship under Head Coach Aaron Struck. This was their first regional championship since 1994.

See also

History of Oklahoma
Timeline of Tulsa, Oklahoma
Oil Capital of the World

References

External links

 City of Glenpool
 Glenpool Public Schools
 "Glenpool,"  Encyclopedia of Oklahoma History and Culture
 "Glenn Pool Field." Encyclopedia of Oklahoma History and Culture

Cities in Oklahoma
Cities in Tulsa County, Oklahoma
Tulsa metropolitan area